Carole Maso is a contemporary American novelist and essayist, known for her experimental, poetic and fragmentary narratives which are often called postmodern. She is a recipient of a 1993 Lannan Literary Award for Fiction.

Biography
Maso was born in Paterson, New Jersey in 1955, the child of her jazz musician father and her emergency department nurse mother.

She received a B.A. in English from Vassar College in 1977. Maso initially wanted to be a journalist when she entered Vassar, but she later decided to focus on creative writing instead. She began working on her novel Ghost Dance while she was still a student. During her senior year at Vassar, she submitted about 50 pages of prose poems as her senior honors thesis. It is at this point that she knew she wanted to be a writer. Maso eschewed the traditional path to teaching and never studied formally beyond her Vassar B.A., despite having been offered a graduate fellowship at Boston University. Rather, she devoted 9 years to learning the craft by doing, writing while alternately working as a waitress, artist's model, and fencing instructor. She also did some house- and cat-sitting, which afforded her time to write. Maso has referred to this period as her "apprenticeship years."

Maso is the recipient of a 1988 NEA fellowship, a 1993 Lannan Literary Fellowship for Fiction, and several other grants. Her first published novel was Ghost Dance, which appeared in 1986. Her best-known novel is probably Defiance, published in 1998. She is a professor of literary arts at Brown University, where she has taught since 1995, and she previously held positions as a writer-in-residence at Illinois State University from 1991 to 1992 and George Washington University from 1992 to 1993. She also taught writing at Columbia University in 1993. A forthcoming novel, The Bay of Angels, incorporates various narrative types—essay, memoir, prose poems, and even graphics—and represents more than 20 years of work. Parts of The Bay of Angels have appeared in journals and anthologies. Maso won a spring 2018 Berlin Prize fellowship, during which she continued to work on The Bay of Angels.

Publications

Novels 
 Ghost Dance. New York: Perennial Library, 1986, 
 The Art Lover. San Francisco: North Point Press, 1990, 
 AVA. Normal, Illinois: Dalkey Archive Press, 1993, 
 The American Woman in the Chinese Hat. Normal, Illinois: Dalkey Archive Press, 1994, 
 Defiance. New York: Dutton, 1998, 
 Mother & Child. Berkeley, CA: Counterpoint Press, 2012,

Short stories 
 Contributor, Tasting Life Twice: Literary Lesbian Fiction by New American Writers, edited by E. J. Levy. New York: Avon Books, 1995.
 Aureole: An Erotic Sequence, Hopewell, New Jersey: Ecco, 1996 (Short fiction collection),

Other 
 Break Every Rule: Essays on Language, Longing, and Moments of Desire. Washington, D.C.: Counterpoint, 2000, 
 The Room Lit by Roses: A Journal of Pregnancy and Birth. Washington, D.C.: Counterpoint, 2002, 
 Beauty is Convulsive: The Passion of Frida Kahlo, 2002, 
 Contributor, Tolstoy's Dictaphone: Technology and the Muse, edited by Sven Birkerts. St. Paul, Minnesota: Graywolf Press, 1996.

References

External links 
 
 WebDelSol's profile of Maso
 Rain Taxi interview with Maso, 1997/98
 Article about Defiance
 Barcelona Review interview with Maso, 2000
 Essay from Break Every Rule

Vassar College alumni
Living people
Illinois State University faculty
George Washington University faculty
Columbia University faculty
Brown University faculty
American lesbian writers
American women novelists
20th-century American novelists
21st-century American novelists
American women short story writers
American LGBT novelists
20th-century American women writers
21st-century American women writers
20th-century American short story writers
21st-century American short story writers
Novelists from Illinois
Novelists from New York (state)
Year of birth missing (living people)